1. FFC 08 Niederkirchen (formerly TuS Niederkirchen) is a German women's football club based in Niederkirchen, Rhineland-Palatinate. The team plays in the German 2. Bundesliga.

History

TuS Niederkirchen 
TuS Niederkirchen was founded in 1900. Since 1969 the club had a women's football department, which was a member of the women's Bundesliga at its inception. After winning the championship in 1992–93 the club was relegated to the Regionalliga in 2000. Several seasons of promotions and relegations followed. In the last season at TuS Niederkirchen the club finished 9th in the 2. Bundesliga. When the club's management decided not to apply for a license for the next season, but did not inform the players about that decision, the entire women's section left the club to found their own. On 25 April 2008 1. FFC 08 Niederkirchen was established, and began playing in the Regionalliga Südwest in 2008–09.

1. FFC 08 Niederkirchen 
After two years in the Regionalliga, the team returned to the 2nd Bundesliga as champions in 2010 and secured its place in the league on the antepenultimate match day. In April 2011 a co-operation - initially lasting two years - was announced with 1. FC Kaiserslautern from 1 July 2011, which was extended by two years in July 2013. In 2015, the team was relegated from the 2nd Bundesliga, but managed direct re-promotion in 2016. Two years later, 1. FFC was relegated again before being promoted after the 2019–20 season.

Honours 

 Champion of the Fußball-Bundesliga (women): 1993
 Winner of the SWFV association cup: 2005, 2010
 Champion of the Regionalliga Südwest: 2005

Notable past players 

  Nicole Bender
  Nadine Fols
  Steffi Jones
  Heidi Mohr
  Conny Pohlers
  Carmen Roth
  Sandra de Pol

Statistics

TuS Niederkirchen

1 The second team of TuS Niederkirchen was also qualified and reached the round of 16.

1. FFC 08 Niederkirchen

References 

Women's football clubs in Germany
Football clubs in Rhineland-Palatinate
Association football clubs established in 2008
2008 establishments in Germany
Frauen-Bundesliga clubs